Hal Jordan's Green Lantern comics have been collected into a number of volumes. The following is a list of them.

List

References

Green Lantern titles